Agios Pavlos or Ayios Pavlos ("Saint Paul") may refer to the following places:

 Agios Pavlos, Thessaloniki
 Agios Pavlos, Chalkidiki
 Ayios Pavlos, Limassol